Ross Bailey (born in 1992) is an entrepreneur and the CEO & Founder of Appear Here, an online marketplace for short-term retail space. 
Considered a commercial real estate disruptor, Bailey has been featured in publications including The Financial Times, The Wall Street Journal, The Guardian, GQ, Property Week, Monocle (UK magazine), Wired (magazine) and TechCrunch.

Bailey was named one of Forbes Europe's 30 Under 30 in 2016 and one of Financial Times’ Top 10 under 30 tech entrepreneurs. In 2018, he was listed in Fast Company's 100 most creative people. He is a regular speaker at conferences regarding retail, e-commerce and technology.

Early life 

Bailey was born in London and completed his education at the School Of Communication Arts 2.0. He started his entrepreneurial journey at age 16 when he attended the Peter Jones Enterprise Academy run by Peter Jones. 
Determined to launch his own business, Bailey tested his ideas by launching a string of successful pop-up shops in destinations across London, including the Rock & Rule pop up for the Queen’s Diamond Jubilee. From this experience, his vision for Appear Here was born.

Career 

In 2013, Bailey founded Appear Here. Based on the concept that renting a commercial property should be as easy as booking a hotel room. In 2019, The Times reported that Bailey and Appear Here were now considering further expansion, seeking to "take on leases for entire department stores" and "capitalising on the struggles of traditional department stores on both sides of the Atlantic".

References

External links 
 Forbes profile: Ross Bailey
 Day in the life with Bailey
 Pros and cons of pop up shops

1992 births
Living people
American company founders